Adrian Błocki (born 11 April 1990) is a male Polish racewalker. He competed for Poland in the 2016 Summer Olympics. He competed in the 50 kilometres walk event at the 2013 World Championships in Athletics. He also competed in the 50 kilometres walk event at the 2015 World Championships in Athletics in Beijing, China.

In 2018, he competed in the men's 50 kilometres walk at the 2018 European Athletics Championships held in Berlin, Germany. He finished in 12th place.

See also
 Poland at the 2015 World Championships in Athletics

References

External links
 
 
 
 

Polish male racewalkers
Living people
Sportspeople from Szczecin
1990 births
World Athletics Championships athletes for Poland
Athletes (track and field) at the 2016 Summer Olympics
Olympic athletes of Poland